The 2019 Oceania Athletics Championships were held in Townsville, Australia between June 25–28, 2019. The event was held jointly with the Oceania under 18 and under 20 championships, including exhibition events for masters and for athletes with disabilities (parasports).

Timetable

Participating teams
A total of 19 teams participated in the senior championships. There were 18 nations with 1 regional team from Australia. The regional Australian team (RAT) competed separately and not as Australia.

  
  (Host)
 / Northern Australia

Medal table
This is an unofficial medal tally of the 2019 championships. The official table can be found on the Oceania Athletics Association website.

Updated: 28 June, 2019

Event summary
Complete results can be found on the Oceania Athletics Association webpage.

Note: Athletes in italics competed as guests.

Men

Track events

Field events

Multi-events

Para events

Women

Track events

Field events

Multi-events

Para events

Mixed

References

2019
2019 in Australian sport
June 2019 sports events in Australia